Trinity United Methodist Church (Trinity Methodist Episcopal Church) is a historic church at E. 18th Ave. and Broadway in Denver, Colorado.

It was built in 1887 and was added to the National Register in 1970.

Frederick Albert Hale (1855–1934) assisted architect Robert S. Roeschlaub (1843–1923) in its design.

References

External links

 

Methodist churches in Colorado
Churches on the National Register of Historic Places in Colorado
Gothic Revival church buildings in Colorado
Churches completed in 1887
National Register of Historic Places in Denver